USS Plover is a name the United States Navy has used more than once in naming a vessel:

 USS Plover (AM-12), but construction of this ship was cancelled 4 December 1918
 USS Plover (AM-408), construction was cancelled on 11 August 1945
 , minesweeper purchased on 16 October 1940
 , laid down 12 October 1943 by Hiltebrant Dry Dock Co., Kingston, New York.

References 

United States Navy ship names